Game fish, sport fish or quarry refer to popular fish pursued by recreational anglers, and can be freshwater or saltwater fish.  Game fish can be eaten after being caught, or released after capture.  Some game fish are also targeted commercially, particularly salmon and tuna.

Specimens of game fish whose measurements (body length and weight) are a lot above the species' average are sometimes known as trophy fish.

Examples

The species of fish prized by anglers varies with geography and tradition. Some fish are sought for their value as food, while others are pursued for their fighting abilities, or for the difficulty of successfully enticing the fish to bite the hook.
 Big-game fish are blue water saltwater bony fish such as tuna, tarpon, grouper and billfish (sailfish, marlin and swordfish). Occasionally other predatory fishes such as sharks, barracuda and dolphinfish are also pursued.
 In North America, many anglers fish for common snook, redfish, salmon/trout, bass, northern pike and muskellunge, walleye/sauger, sturgeon and several catfish species.
 The smallest fish routinely sought by anglers are called panfish, because they typically can fit as a whole into a normal cooking pan. Examples are crappies, perch, rock bass, bluegills and other sunfish (Centrarchidae). Panfish are often sought by younger anglers, at least partly due to the relative ease with which they can be caught.
 In the United Kingdom, "game fish" refers specifically to salmonids (other than grayling) – that is, salmon, trout and char.  Other popular freshwater fish are called coarse fish or rough fish.

Some popular game fish have been introduced and stocked worldwide.  Rainbow trout, for instance, can be found nearly anywhere the climate is appropriate, from their native range on the Pacific Coast of North America to the mountains of southern Africa, and is now listed as one of the worst invasive species.

Game-fish tagging programs
As part of the catch-and-release practice encouraged to promote conservation, tagging programs were established. Some of their goals are to improve the management of fisheries resources and to keep records on abundance, growth rates, age, migrations, and strain identification.

Some well-known tagging programs in the United States are the South Carolina Marine Game Fish Tagging Program and the Virginia Game Fish Tagging Program. The South Carolina Marine Game Fish Tagging Program began in 1974 and it is now the largest public tagging program in the Southeastern United States. Anglers are trained and then receive a tag kit with tags, applicator, and instructions. When they tag a fish, anglers use a reply postcard they receive in advance to send the information on the tag number, tag date, location, species, and size. This program issues anglers who tag and release 30 or more eligible species within a year a conservation award. When an angler recaptures a tagged fish, they then should report the recapture. If possible, the tag number and the mailing address should be reported, along with the location and date of the recapture, as well with the measurement of the fish. The objective is to provide biologists with the necessary information to determine growth rate through an accurate measurement. The Virginia Game Fish Tagging Program started operations in 1995 and keeps records on recaptured fish since then. This is an annual program that starts in January and it is limited to 160 anglers. Anglers receive training workshops in February and March.

Records
The official guide to world salt- and freshwater fish records is the World Record Game Fishes, published annually by the International Game Fish Association (IGFA), which maintains records for nearly 400 species around the world. The records are categorised, with separate records for juniors, for the type of tackle and line used, for fly fishing, and locality records. The IGFA also organize the world saltwater championship tournaments.

See also
 Fishing tournament
 Coarse fishing
 List of freshwater game fish
 List of marine game fish
 Game (hunting)

References

Sources
 Dunn, Bob (2000) Saltwater Game Fishes of the World. Australian Fishing Network.

Recreational fishing
 

pt:Peixe esportivo